Sovereign is a special service area within the Rural Municipality of St. Andrews No. 287, Saskatchewan, Canada. In 2016, Sovereign had a population of 25 people. It had village status prior to December 31, 2005. The community is located 26 km south east of the Town of Rosetown on Highway 15.

Demographics 

See also 
List of communities in Saskatchewan
List of hamlets in Saskatchewan

References 

Designated places in Saskatchewan
Former villages in Saskatchewan
Special service areas in Saskatchewan
Populated places disestablished in 2005
St. Andrews No. 287, Saskatchewan
Division No. 12, Saskatchewan